Wrong-way driver warning is a new advanced driver-assistance system introduced in 2010 to prevent wrong-way driving.

In the case of signs imposing access restrictions, through the wrong-way driver warning function an acoustic warning is emitted together with a visual warning in the instrument cluster – making an effective contribution towards helping to prevent serious accidents caused by wrong-way drivers.

Vehicles
In 2010, Nissan has developed a GPS-enabled warning system to alert drivers travelling in the wrong direction on motorways. The first application is the Nissan Fuga hybrid luxury sedan. The system, uses GPS positioning data, map data and vehicle speed data to determine if the vehicle is travelling against the flow of traffic.  The system identifies an area for determining the normal direction of flow, such as around junctions. When the vehicle passes through that area, the system records its direction of travel. If the vehicle enters that area again and the system determines that it's driving in the opposite direction it provides audible and visual warnings.
2011 Toyota introduced Wrong-Way Driving Alert incorporated into navigation systems (only in Japan). Gives on-screen and voice alerts to wrong-way drivers. The function monitors vehicle direction on highways and selected toll roads, including at tollgates, service area ramps, turn-offs and junctions. The new function was made possible by advances in communications-based map-updating technology and in pinpoint position-recognition technology that uses information from GPS, gyro1, vehicle-speed and other sensors to determine accurate vehicle movement.
In 2013 Mercedes-Benz introduced wrong-way driver warning function on the Mercedes-Benz S-Class (W222) and the facelift Mercedes-Benz E-Class (W212).

References

Computer-related introductions in 2010
Vehicle safety technologies
Satellite navigation
Warning systems
Advanced driver assistance systems